Outlands in the Eighty Acres, also known as Flanders Mansion is a 8,000-square-foot Tudor Revival house. It is significant as a work of architect Henry Higby Gutterson and for its innovative construction with light grey interlocking Precast concrete blocks. The mansion is preserved within the Mission Trail Nature Preserve in Carmel-by-the-Sea, California. It was listed on the National Register of Historic Places on March 23, 1989.

History

Paul and Grace Flanders, married in 1920, came to Carmel in 1922, to build a home and start a business in real estate development. They purchased 80 acres of land from Dr. Daniel T. MacDougal, of the coastal botanical lab for the  Carnegie Institution in Carmel-by-the-Sea, California. Flanders designed a two-story home, which they named the Outlands at 25800 Hatton Road, located on a hill overlooking the Carmel Mission, and Point Lobos.

The Flander's were one of the first Carmelites to hire an outside architect, Henry Higby Gutterson, to design and build their residence. He had supervised the architect for the first subdivision in northern California, the St. Francis Wood, San Francisco. The Flanders Mansion lies at the end of a long driveway off Hatton Road surrounded by upper end of the Mission Trail Nature Preserve. The "Outlands" English cottage design was one of the first use of this style of residential architecture in Carmel By-the-Sea. The construction with light grey interlocking Precast concrete blocks was produced by the Carmel Thermotile Company. The material was advertised as "fireproof, waterproof and practically everlasting."

In 1925, Flanders became the president of the Carmel Land Company and helped develop Hatton Fields, southeast of Carmel-by-the-Sea. The new company formed an office on Ocean Avenue between Louis S. Slevin's general merchandise store and the Carmel Bakery. Paul Flanders was president, Ernest Schweninger was secretary, and Peter Mawdsley was the treasurer.

The City of Carmel purchased the Flanders mansion and adjoining 14.9 acres in 1972 from the Flanders heirs for $275,000. It has become part of the 34-acre Mission Trail Nature Preserve. Part of this property is now the Rowntree Native Plant Garden at 25800 Hatton Road.

The non-profit organization Flanders Foundation was formed in 1998 to preserve, enhance, and maintain the city owned  the Flanders Mansion and Mission Trail Nature Preserve. As of 1018, the City of Carmel is looking for a curator to donate their time, skills, and financial resources to restore the Flanders Mansion in exchange for rent-free use of the Mansion for 20 years.

See also
 Carmel-by-the-Sea, California
 National Register of Historic Places listings in Monterey County, California

References

External links 
 

 Outlands in the Eighty Acres
 National Register of Historic Places in Monterey County
 Mission Trail Nature Preserve

Buildings and structures in Monterey County, California
Buildings and structures in California
1925 establishments in California
Carmel-by-the-Sea, California